Eucalyptus acroleuca, commonly known as the Lakefield coolibah, is a tree that is endemic to Cape York Peninsula in northern Australia. It has rough, tessellated bark near its base then smooth, white bark, lance-shaped leaves, oval to club-shaped buds with a hemispherical operculum and cup-shaped fruits.

Description 
The upper bark is smooth, white and shed annually. The operculum is hemispherical, about half as long as the flower cup.

Taxonomy and naming
Eucalyptus acroleuca was first formally described in 1994 by Lawrie Johnson and Ken Hill from a specimen collected near the New Laura Homestead. The specific epithet (acroleuca) is derived from the Ancient Greek words acros meaning "highest" and leucos meaning "white", referring to the white bark on the higher branches of this species.

Distribution and habitat
This tree often grows in pure stands in woodland in heavy soils that are flooded in the wet season, and often grows near permanent lagoons. It occurs in the Rinyirru National Park.

Conservation
Eucalyptus acroleuca is classed as "least concern" under the Queensland Government Nature Conservation Act 1992.

See also
List of Eucalyptus species

References

acroleuca
Trees of Australia
Myrtales of Australia
Flora of Queensland
Plants described in 1994
Taxa named by Lawrence Alexander Sidney Johnson
Taxa named by Ken Hill (botanist)